The 1936 Tulane Green Wave football team represented Tulane University as a member of the Southeastern Conference (SEC) during the 1936 college football season. Led by first-year head coach Red Dawson, the Green Wave played their home games at Tulane Stadium in New Orleans. Tulane finished the season with an overall record of 6–3–1 and a mark of 2–3–1 in conference play, placing eighth in the SEC.

Schedule

Rankings

References

Tulane
Tulane Green Wave football seasons
Tulane Green Wave football